The Westchester Hills Cemetery is at 400 Saw Mill River Road in Hastings-on-Hudson, Westchester County, New York, approximately 20 miles north of New York City.  It is a Jewish cemetery, and many well-known entertainers and performers are interred there. It was founded by the Stephen Wise Free Synagogue in 1919 when the synagogue acquired the northern portion of the Mount Hope Cemetery.

Notable interments
 Barricini family, boxed candy makers
 Charles E. Bloch (1927–2006), President Bloch Publishing Company
 Mischa Elman (1891–1967), violinist
 I. J. Fox (1888–1947), notable furrier
 Joyce Pinn Fox (1931–2020), banking executive
 Captain George Fried (1877–1949), won Navy Cross for rescue of ships Antinoe, and Florida
 Stanley P. Friedman (1925–2006), writer
 John Garfield (1913–1952), actor
 George Gershwin (1898–1937), composer
 Ira Gershwin (1896–1983), lyricist
 Jonah Goldman (1906–1980), baseball player
 Ben Grauer (1908–1977), television and radio personality
 Guggenheim family, founders of the Guggenheim Museum
 Sidney Hillman (1887–1946), first president of Amalgamated Clothing Workers of America
 Judy Holliday (1921–1965), actress
 Allyn King (1899–1930), Broadway actress and former Ziegfeld Follies performer
 Richard Lindner (1901–1976), German-American painter
 Lucille Lortel (1900–1999), actress and producer
 Arnold Newman (1918–2006), photographer
 Roberta Peters (1930–2017), opera singer
 Tony Randall (1920–2004), actor
 Max Reinhardt (1873–1943), producer and director
 Billy Rose (1899–1966), Broadway producer
 A. M. Rosenthal (1922–2006), Pulitzer Prize–winning journalist
 Robert Rossen (1908–1966), motion picture director and screenwriter
 Ron Silver (1946–2009), American actor, director, and producer
 Lee Strasberg (1901–1982), actor-teacher
 Paula Strasberg (1909–1966), actress-teacher
 Irving Sturm (1932–2010), founder of Iridium Jazz Club and Ellen's Stardust Diner
 Maxine Sullivan (1911–1987), American jazz vocalist and performer
 David Susskind (1920–1987), Emmy award-winning producer
 Laurence Tisch (1923–2003), head of CBS and co-founder of Loews, brother of Preston
 Preston Robert Tisch (1926–2005), financier and business magnate, brother of Laurence
 Rabbi Stephen Wise (1874–1949), religious leader
 Louise Waterman Wise (1874–1947), social worker and artist, wife of Stephen Wise
 Alexandra Pregel (1907–1984), Russian-American artist
 Boris Pregel (1893–1976), scientist-physicist

References

External links
 

1919 establishments in New York (state)
Cemeteries in Westchester County, New York
Jewish cemeteries in New York (state)